Haydar Hassan Haj Al-Sidig known as Ali Gagarin (born 1 April 1949 in Omdurman) is a Sudanese former footballer who played with Al-Hilal Club. He participated in the Africa Cup of Nations 1970 and 1976.
He earned his nickname of Ali Gagarin when he played professional football for Al-Hilal, one Sudan's biggest teams, his meteoric rise in the sport was likened to that of the famous Soviet cosmonaut Yuri Gagarin.

Having retired from playing sport, he became an administrator, who has held posts, such as vice-president at Al-Hilal and also in politics, as a director general at the Ministry of Foreign Affairs ambassador.

Honours

Clubs
Al-Hilal Club
Sudan Premier League
Champions (3): 1966, 1969, 1973
Al Nassr FC
Kings Cup (Saudi Arabia)
Winners (1): 1976

National
Sudan National Football Team
African Cup of Nations
Champions (1) :1970

International goals

References

External links
Player profile - Home of football statistics & history
Haydar Hassan Al-Sidig the ambassador  - Sudan Tribune

1949 births
Living people
Association football forwards
Sudanese footballers
Sudan international footballers
Al-Hilal Club (Omdurman) players
Al Nassr FC players
Saudi Professional League players
1970 African Cup of Nations players
1976 African Cup of Nations players
Africa Cup of Nations-winning players
Expatriate footballers in Saudi Arabia
Sudanese expatriate footballers